Greenwood Cemetery is a cemetery located in downtown Jackson, Mississippi.  Still in use, it was established by a federal land grant on November 21, 1821.  It was originally known simply as "The Graveyard" and later as "City Cemetery" before the present name was adopted in 1899.  It is the final resting place of Confederate generals, former governors of Mississippi, mayors of Jackson, as well as other notable figures, the most recent of whom is internationally acclaimed author Eudora Welty.  The graves of over 100 "unknown" Confederate soldiers are also located here. Greenwood Cemetery was listed on the National Register of Historic Places and as a Mississippi Landmark in 1984.

The "garden park" type cemetery contains the largest collection of everblooming "own root" (not grafted) antique and modern shrubs roses in the country – several hundred shrubs representing over 40 named cultivars – as well as numerous hardy bulbs and other flowering shrubs and trees.

Notable interments

Confederate generals
 Daniel Weisiger Adams
 William Wirt Adams
 William Barksdale
 Samuel Wragg Ferguson
 Richard Griffith
 James Argyle Smith

Mississippi governors
 Albert Gallatin Brown
 John Isaac Guion
 Charles Lynch
 Alexander Gallatin McNutt
 George Poindexter
 Abram Marshall Scott
 William Lewis Sharkey
 Wiliam Winter

Others
 Erasmus R. Burt
 Perry Cohea
 Wiley P. Harris
 James D. Lynch
 Edmund Richardson
 Eudora Welty

See also
 List of governors of Mississippi

References

External links

 
 
 

Jackson, Mississippi
Protected areas of Hinds County, Mississippi
Cemeteries on the National Register of Historic Places in Mississippi
Tourist attractions in Jackson, Mississippi
1821 establishments in Mississippi
Mississippi Landmarks
National Register of Historic Places in Jackson, Mississippi
Cemeteries established in the 1820s